The Book of Gutsy Women: Favorite Stories of Courage and Resilience is a book co-authored by Hillary Rodham Clinton, the former U.S. first lady, senator, and secretary of state, and her daughter Chelsea Clinton. It is Hillary Clinton's eighth book with her publisher, Simon & Schuster.

It was released on October 1, 2019, and includes portraits of "gutsy women" including Chimamanda Ngozi Adichie, Mary Ritter Beard, Harriet Tubman, Edith Windsor, and Malala Yousafzai.  In many cases the authors describe how the subjects influenced their lives and in some cases how they met them.
In explaining their motivation to write the book, the authors say, "If history shows one thing, it's that the world needs gutsy women. So in the moments when the long haul seems awfully long, we hope you will draw strength from these stories. We do."  Hillary Clinton added, "This book is a continuation of a conversation Chelsea and I have been having since she was a little girl, and we are excited to welcome others into that conversation."

The book received mixed-to-positive critical notices from those media outlets that reviewed it.  It spent ten weeks on The New York Times Best Seller list.

Background
The first book co-authored by the mother and daughter, it has sections labeled as "Hillary", "Chelsea", and "Hillary and Chelsea" to clarify who wrote what.  The former wrote in longhand while the latter sought to use collaborative software, making the writing process somewhat frustrating.  The book was also written with the assistance of Lauren Peterson, a former speechwriter from her 2016 presidential campaign.  There are no footnotes or other indications in the book of where the research for the profiles comes from.

Financial terms of the book were not disclosed when the project was announced in August 2019.

Contents
More than one hundred women are featured in the volume, selected from more than two hundred essays the pair wrote.  Entries range from 17th-century nun and self-taught scholar Juana Inés de la Cruz to contemporary teenage climate activist Greta Thunberg, and include women who are little known to the general public.  Some of the less familiar subjects include astronomer Caroline Herschel, doctor Mary Edwards Walker, pediatrician and professor Mona Hanna-Attisha, and women's rights advocate Manal al-Sharif.  Some family members of the Clintons are also included as subjects.

The cover image shows, as the authors state, a group of women firefighters in a training exercise at Pearl Harbor Naval Shipyard sometime after U.S. entry into World War II. (The photograph has often been mislabeled as being made during the attack on Pearl Harbor. The story behind the black-and-white image was told by investigative reporter Bill Dedman in 2011. It has been colorized for the cover of this book.)

Complete list 
These are the entries in the book, as listed in its Table of Contents:

Early Inspirations 

 First Inspirations
 Harriet Tubman
 Anna Pavlova, Isadora Duncan, Maria Tallchief, and Virginia Johnson
 Helen Keller
 Margaret Chase Smith
 Margaret Bourke-White
 Maria von Trapp
 Anne Frank
 Rigoberta Menchú Tum
 Jackie Joyner-Kersee and Florence Griffith Joyner

Education Pioneers 

 Sor Juana Inés de la Cruz
 Margaret Bancroft
 Juliette Gordon Low
 Maria Montessori and Joan Ganz Cooney
 Mary McLeod Bethune
 Esther Martinez
 Daisy Bates
 Patsy Mink, Bernice Sandler, and Edith Green
 Edith Green
 Ruby Bridges Hall
 Malala Yousafzai

Earth Defenders 

 Marjory Stoneman Douglas
 Rachel Carson
 Jane Jacobs and Peggy Shepard
 Jane Goodall and "The Trimates"
 Wangari Maathai
 Alice Min Soo Chun
 Greta Thunberg

Explorers and Inventors 

 Caroline Herschel and Vera Rubin
 Ada Lovelace and Grace Hopper
 Margaret Knight and Madam C.J. Walker
 Marie Curie and Irène Joliot-Curie
 Hedy Lamarr
 Sylvia Earle
 Sally Ride
 Mae Jemison

Healers 

 Florence Nightingale
 Clara Barton
 Elizabeth Blackwell, Rebecca Lee Crumpler, and Mary Edwards Walker
 Betty Ford
 Mathilde Krim
 Dr. Gao Yaojie
 Dr. Hawa Abdi
 Flossie Wong-Staal
 Molly Melching
 Dr. Mona Hanna-Attisha
 Vaccinators

Athletes 

 Alice Coachman and Wilma Rudolph
 Junko Tabei
 Billie Jean King
 Diana Nyad
 Abby Wambach
 Michelle Kwan
 Venus and Serena Williams
 Ibtihaj Muhammad
 Tatyana McFaddenn
 Caster Semenya
 Aly Raisman

Advocates and Activists 

 Dorothy Height and Sojourner Truth
 Ida B. Wells
 Eleanor Roosevelt
 Elizabeth Peratrovich
 Rosa Parks and Claudette Colvin
 Coretta Scott King
 Dolores Huerta
 The Peacemakers
 Victoria Mxenge
 Ai-jen Poo
 Sarah Brady, Gabby Giffords, Nelba Màrquez-Green, Shannon Watts, and Lucy McBath
 Nza-Ari Khepra, Emma Gonzàlez, Naomi Wadler, Edna Chavez, Jazmine Wildcat, and Julia Spoor
 Becca Heller

Storytellers 

 Maya Angelou
 Mary Beard
 Jineth Bedoya Lima
 Chimamanda Ngozi Adichie
 America Ferrera
 Ali Stroker
 Amani Al-Khatahtbeh

Elected Leaders 

 Bella Abzug
 Shirley Chisholm
 Ann Richards
 Geraldine Ferraro
 Barbara Jordan
 Barbara Mikulski
 Ellen Johnson Sirleaf
 Wilma Mankiller
 Michelle Bachelet
 Danica Roem

Groundbreakers 

 Frances Perkins
 Katharine Graham
 Constance Baker Motley
 Edie Windsor
 Ela Bhatt
 Temple Grandin
 Ellen DeGeneres
 Maya Lin
 Sally Yates
 Kimberly Bryant and Reshma Saujani

Women's Rights Champions 

 Rosa May Billinghurst
 The Suffragists
 Sophia Duleep Singh
 Fraidy Reiss
 Manal al-Sharif
 Nadia Murad

Promotional activities
Upon the book's release, the authors appeared on several television talk shows to promote it.  They also staged a book tour around the country, with some appearances being held under the title "An Evening and Conversation with Hillary Rodham Clinton and Chelsea Clinton".  Sales were brisk in some locations, with tickets for an appearance at the Trinity United Methodist Church in Denver being gone within an hour.

Additional attention came to Hillary Clinton during interviews for the book, as publication of it happened to coincide with the filing on an official impeachment inquiry against the man who had defeated her in the 2016 election.  At a book tour appearance at the National Constitution Center in Philadelphia, which drew some 650 people, she said, "How appropriate that we would talk about a constitutional crisis such as the one we are in, right here at the Constitution Center."  She asked whether anyone in the president's party was willing to act like the pioneering U.S. senator Margaret Chase Smith, who was one of the profiles in the book.

Reception
The book received a positive notice from Viv Groskop, writing for the British newspaper i, who praised the "beautifully written stories of women's lives" and characterized it as "possibly a first: a cultural artefact inspired by a mother and a daughter which is neither cringeworthily sentimental nor frighteningly bitchy." Groskop concluded by saying, "The whole thing feels like a restrained statement of rebellion and also a sort of consolation."  Feminist author Jo Freeman, writing for SeniorWomenWeb, said "This is a book that every young woman needs to read." Nancy Gilson in The Columbus Dispatch wrote that "a sense of female camaraderie permeates the book. ... It is a pleasure to read about favorite female heroines and an even greater pleasure to discover new ones."

Others were more critical, like The Daily Telegraph'''s Madeline Grant, who criticized the book for failing to include Margaret Thatcher – "the ultimate gutsy woman" in her words. Camilla Long of The Sunday Times wrote that the book "isn't a book of feminist icons – it's a list of people who think the same as Hillary." Keziah Featherstone, writing for TES, said that for educators the book was "a great introduction for those dedicated to a diverse and representative curriculum ... the range included is undoubtedly terrific."  But she noted that the work "is framed as a long (long) conversation between mother and daughter" and said that was a detriment to readers who did not care that much about the Clintons.The Book of Gutsy Women sold almost 30,000 print copies in its first week of availability, good for second place in the Publishers Weekly'' ranking of adult nonfiction.  The book debuted at number two on The New York Times Best Seller list for combined print and e-book nonfiction for the week of October 20, 2019.  In subsequent weeks it fell to number eight and then number thirteen, fell off the list, then reappeared for two more weeks at numbers fourteen and ten, fell off the list, then reappeared again at number fifteen.  It fell off the list again, only to reappear during the holiday shopping season at number eight and then number six.  This was followed by a drop to number thirteen and then, for its final appearance, number fifteen for the week of January 12, 2020.  In all it had appeared on the list on ten non-consecutive weeks.

References

External links
 Excerpt published by CBS News
 Authors discussing book on C-SPAN

2019 non-fiction books
Books by Hillary Clinton
Books about feminism
Simon & Schuster books
Collaborative non-fiction books